The Capture of York Factory was a 1694 Anglo-French conflict on Hudson Bay. In 1686 Pierre Le Moyne d'Iberville marched overland from Québec  and captured all the English posts on James Bay. This left York Factory, which was too far away and could only be reached by sea. In 1688 King William's War started and the needed ships were hard to get. In 1690 Iberville tried to take York Factory but was driven away by a larger English ship. In 1694 Governor Frontenac gave him the ships Salamandre and Poli. Iberville reached the Nelson River on 14 September. The fort was invested and on 14 October it surrendered. (The English garrison consisted mainly of traders, clerks and laborers and they had not brought in enough firewood to withstand a long siege).

Among the 53 men who surrendered was Henry Kelsey. The post was renamed Fort Bourbon. Since it was late in the season both the Canadiens and their captives had to spend the winter there. By the time the ice broke up many on both sides had died of scurvy. Iberville waited, hoping to capture the annual English supply ships. By September they had not arrived, so he left 70 men at the fort and sailed for La Rochelle with a valuable load of furs.

Iberville's victory was nullified by two factors. The previous year (1693) the English had recaptured Fort Albany to the south on James Bay. Ten months after Iberville left three Royal Navy frigates under William Allen recaptured York Factory.

References

 

King William's War
York Factory
York Factory
17th century in Canada
New France
Hudson's Bay Company
Military history of Manitoba
York Factory
1694 in North America
1694 in Canada